Atsicholos is a mountain village in the municipal unit Gortyna, Arcadia, Greece. It is considered a traditional settlement which is situated on a mountain slope above the right bank of the river Lousios, near its confluence with the Alfeios. It is 2 km east of  Vlachorraptis, 4 km west of Elliniko and 5 km north of Karytaina.

The village has significant Byzantine-era remains, and sights include the local Church of St. Athanasios, a laurel forest and the nearby monastery of Panagia Kalamiou.

Population

See also
List of settlements in Arcadia
List of traditional settlements of Greece

References

External links
 Atsicholos on the GTP Travel Pages

Gortyna, Arcadia
Populated places in Arcadia, Peloponnese